Miangaran-e Sofla (also Romanized as Mīāngarān-e Soflá and Meyāngarān Soflá; also known as Mīāngarān-e Pā’īn) is a village in Howmeh-ye Gharbi Rural District, in the Central District of Izeh County, Khuzestan Province, Iran. At the 2006 census, its population was 429, in 78 families.

References 

Populated places in Izeh County